Marktredwitz is a town in the district of Wunsiedel, in Bavaria, Germany, close to the Czech border. It is situated 22 km west of Cheb, 50 km east of Bayreuth and 50 km south of Hof/Saale. Marktredwitz station is at the junction of the Nuremberg–Cheb railway and the Munich–Hof railway.

The town celebrated the Horticultural Show 2006 in cooperation with Cheb.

People 

 Ronny Krippner, organist
 Birgit Lodes, musicologist
 Oscar Loew, agricultural chemist
 Ersen Martin, former footballer
 Erkan Martin, former footballer
 Reinhard Pöllath (born 1948), German businessman
 Karl Ritter, Nazi politician
 Reinhard Scheer, admiral

Clubs
 Volleyballgemeinschaft Fichtelgebirge Marktredwitz

References

Wunsiedel (district)